Chris Winter (born July 22, 1986 in North Vancouver, British Columbia) is a Canadian track and field athlete competing in the middle-distance events, predominantly the 3,000m steeplechase. Winter attended Handsworth Secondary graduating in the spring of 2004 before moving to Eugene to compete for the University of Oregon. Winter competed for the Ducks from 2004 to 2009 as a key member to their middle distance team in both cross country and track. After placing 6th at the 2008 NCAA West Regional, Winter advanced for his first time to the NCAA division one Championships where he placed 12th against the collegiate bests. In his senior season, Winter returned to the NCAA Championships to improve on his previous performance with a 9th-place finish in  a time of 8:46.06, just one position back from scoring for the Ducks. 

Winter has represented Canada on multiple world stages. In 2003, Winter won bronze in the 2000m Steeplechase at the World U18 Track & Field Championships, running a time of 5:44.23. From here Winter continued to be one of Canada's top steeplechasers, moving on to compete at the 2004 World Junior Track & Field Championships in Grosseto, Italy. As a senior Winter competed at the 2014 Commonwealth Games in Glasgow, finishing in a 6th position with a time of 8:29.83.  

In July 2016 Winter reached the pinnacle of his career and was officially named to Canada's Olympic team. Winter went on to compete for Canada at the 2016 Rio de Janeiro Olympic Games in the 3000m Steeplechase in a time of 8:33.95. 

At the end of the 2016 year Winter announced his retirement from the sport of track and field. While the Olympics were the finale of his professional career, Winter considers his journey throughout the sport to be what he is most proud of. His retirement hasn't stopped him from running. You can often catch him at BC Endurance Project workouts pacing his wife and Canadian marathon record holder, Rachel Cliff. 

Life Time Bests:

 1500m - 3:44.57
 Mile - 4:11.27 
 3000m - 8:06.05 (Indoor)
 3000 Steeplechase - 8:26.55
 5000m: 13:58.17

References

1986 births
Living people
Sportspeople from North Vancouver
Canadian male steeplechase runners
Athletes (track and field) at the 2016 Summer Olympics
Olympic track and field athletes of Canada